Prodoxus is a genus of moths of the family Prodoxidae. The members of this genus are known as bogus yucca moths.

Species
 Prodoxus aenescens
 Prodoxus atascosanellus
 Prodoxus barberellus
 Prodoxus californicus
 Prodoxus carnerosanellus
 Prodoxus cinereus
 Prodoxus coloradensis
 Prodoxus gypsicolor
 Prodoxus intricatus
 Prodoxus mapimiensis
 Prodoxus marginatus (syn: Prodoxus pulverulentus)
 Prodoxus ochrocarus
 Prodoxus pallidus
 Prodoxus phylloryctus
 Prodoxus praedictus
 Prodoxus quinquepunctellus
 Prodoxus sonorensis
 Prodoxus sordidus
 Prodoxus tamaulipellus
 Prodoxus tehuacanensis
 Prodoxus weethumpi
 Prodoxus y-inversus

References

Prodoxus at tolweb

Prodoxidae
Adeloidea genera